Xihu District is a District under the administration of the city of Benxi, Liaoning province, People's Republic of China.

Administrative divisions
There are six subdistricts, three towns, and one township in the district.

Subdistricts:
Hedong Subdistrict, Hexi Subdistrict, Caitun Subdistrict, Caibei Subdistrict, Shujing Subdistrict, Dongfeng Subdistrict

Towns: 
Huolianzhai, Shiqiaozi, Waitoushan

The only township is Zhangqizhai Township

References

External links
Xihu District Government website (Chinese)

County-level divisions of Liaoning
Benxi